Hargaon is a town and a nagar panchayat in Sitapur district in the Indian state of Uttar Pradesh.

Demographics
 India census, Hargaon had a population of 20,920. Males constitute 53% of the population and females 47%. Hargaon has an average literacy rate of 56%, lower than the national average of 59.5%: male literacy is 64%, and female literacy is 48%. In Hargaon, 18% of the population is under 6 years of age.

Schools
Hargaon has multiple schools. The oldest are Birla Vidya Mandir Primary School, Birla Vidya Mandir Inter College (since 1955), Junior High School and Girls Junior High School. Both Birla Vidya Mandir schools are run by Birla Sugar Factory management while other junior high schools are run by the state government. Recently three more schools that have been making waves are Green Field Academy, Gurudwara School, Gurunanak Inter college and Rajasthali public school.

Temples

In the town there are many old temples. One of the oldest temple known as "Teerth". Another temple that is Laxmi Narayan Mandir run by Birla Sugar Factory management.

History

City Was Ruled By Local Zamidar Of Afgava A Zamindari Of 21 Villages Kalika Prasad Awasthi And Parmeshwar Din Awasthi In 20 th Century Also A Freedom Fighter But India Become Near To Independence British Looted His Treasury Near 15 Lakhs After British Has Powerful Army At That Time They First Attacked On  15 June 1946 At 9:00 Am But The Kothar Was Saved By Servants And Some Soldier Mens Who Had Loyalist But In The Second Day Of Battle British Under Brigadier Chris Campbell Launch An Early Attack At 6:00 Am An Army Of 150 Infantry And 50 Cavalery Moved Towards North Haragaon Destroyed The Army Of Zamindar Approx 70 Infantry At The Kothar But Family Of Zamindar Was Safe And Moved To Lakhimpur And British Looted Treasury And Villages And Go Back To England Zamindar And Brother Also Fought Against The British For Independence After Independence India Abolished The Zamindari His Son Was Pyare Lal Awasthi A Jila VidyLaya Nirakshak   And Desecandats Now Live In Lakhimpur, The Ruins of the Kothar Still Watch In Afgava. But Pyare Lal Awasthi Was Known as a Freedom Fighter in Afgava ForHis Braveness .

References

Cities and towns in Sitapur district